Stoker's is a brand of smokeless tobacco, specifically dipping tobacco and chewing tobacco, based in the United States.

Stoker's is known for selling moist snuff in 12-oz tubs with a refillable can included. Tubs are sold with a metal lid and a plastic base. One tub is the equivalent to ten 1.2-oz standard cans and single 1.2-oz cans are available in select markets. The label on the Stoker's can says that the Stoker's cut has more flavor.

In 2021, net sales of Stoker's Products amounted $124.3 million.

History
Stoker's began as a family-run business by Fred Stoker but is now run by Bobby Stoker. Fred Stoker began by producing and selling long-leaf tobacco in West Tennessee in the early 1900s. Eventually, this evolved into a mail-order bulk tobacco business.  The company's first chewing tobacco, 24-C, was released in the 1940s.  Differing from other manufacturers of chewing tobacco, Stoker's sells its chew in 16-oz bags, in contrast to the standard 3 oz. More recently, Stoker's has entered the dipping market.

Varieties

Moist snuff
Long Cut Wintergreen
Long Cut Natural
Long Cut Straight
Long Cut Mint
Long Cut Cool Wintergreen
Fine Cut Wintergreen
Fine Cut Natural

Chewing tobacco
24-C (8 and 16 oz)
L-50 (8 and 16 oz) like l50
Apple (8 and 16 oz)
Peach (8 and 16 oz)
Black Wild Cherry (8 and 16 oz)
Fred's Choice (8 and 16 oz)
24-M (16 oz)
Tequila Sunrise (16 oz)
Wintergreen (16 oz)
Butternut (16 oz)
Tennessee Chew Original (3, 8, and 16 oz)
Tennessee Chew Moonshine (16 oz)
Red Supreme (3, 8, and 16 oz)

References

External links
Official Website
StokersSnuff.com
Hookah Equipment

Tobacco brands
Chewing tobacco brands
IARC Group 1 carcinogens